The  is an electric multiple unit (EMU) train type operated by the private railway operator Seibu Railway on commuter services in the Tokyo area of Japan. First introduced in April 2008, a total of six 10-car sets, eighteen 8-car sets, and six 2-car sets were built by Hitachi between 2008 and 2016 to replace older three-door 101 series and 301 series sets.

Design
Six-car sets were also scheduled to be built by fiscal 2011, but none were ultimately delivered.

Fleet
, the fleet consists of six ten-car sets, 18 eight-car sets, and six two-car sets, based at Kotesashi, Minami-Iriso, Musashigaoka, and Tamagawa-Josui depots for use on Seibu Shinjuku Line and Seibu Ikebukuro Line workings.

The last set ordered, eight-car set 38118, was delivered in June 2016, bring the total size of the fleet to 216 vehicles (30 sets).

Formations
Sets are formed as shown below.

2-car sets
The six 2-car sets, numbered 32101 to 32106, are formed as follows, with car 1 at the Hanno end.

 The Mc cars are equipped with two single-arm pantographs.

8-car sets
The eighteen 8-car sets, numbered 38101 to 38118, are formed as follows, with car 1 at the Hanno end.

 The M1 and M5 cars are each equipped with one single-arm pantograph.

10-car sets
The six 10-car sets, numbered 30101 to 30106, are formed as follows, with car 1 at the Hanno end.

 The M1 and M6 cars are each equipped with one single-arm pantograph.

Interior
Seating consists of longitudinal bench seating throughout. Wheelchair spaces are provided in the two outermost cars at each end of eight-car sets and in the 32100 cars of two-car sets. Priority seats are provided at the end of each car. Sets built from fiscal 2013 feature LED lighting and transparent overhead luggage racks in place of the earlier stainless steel pipe racks.

Batches 1–6

Batches 7–10

History
The first train entered service on the Seibu Shinjuku Line on 26 April 2008.

Livery variations

Doraemon 
From 8 October 2020, eight-car set 38101 was operated with an all-over Doraemon-themed wrap. The sides are blue; some doors resemble Doraemon, and others are plain, in line with the rest of the body. The interior is also Doraemon-themed.

Interior

Fleet history
The fleet history details are as shown below.

2-car sets

8-car sets

10-car sets

References

External links

 Seibu 30000 series train information 
  

Electric multiple units of Japan
30000 series
Train-related introductions in 2008
Hitachi multiple units
1500 V DC multiple units of Japan